The EM-11 Orka (orca) is a touring and executive aircraft manufactured in Poland.

History
The EM-11 was designed by Edward Margański of Margański & Mysłowski Zakłady Lotnicze (Margański & Mysłowski Aviation Works), who were previously known for their Swift S-1 and MDM-1 Fox sailplanes. Work on this new low cost, light utility aircraft, of unorthodox configuration, with slim glider-like fuselage and two pusher engines, started in 2001 and was constructed of composite materials with a 4-seat cab placed low, for easier boarding. Luggage is stored behind the rear seats. Composite fuselage was a development of sailpane fuselage. As the designer Edward Margański pointed out, his goal was to create flying limousine "for people, not only for pilots", offering good visibility, comfort and ease of boarding. He expressed also, that his ambition was always to create beautiful aircraft, an in this field his inspiration was Let L-200 Morava.

The first prototype EM-11, registered SP-YEN, flew 8 August 2003.  It has a fixed tricycle landing gear and Rotax 912 engines. The second prototype, registered SP-YEP, was to be a pattern for serial production variant EM-11C, flew 20 October 2005 with Lycoming IO-320 engines and retractable landing gear. In April 2011 EM-11C Orka was EASA certified and is currently in production.
Prior to certification, two prototypes and three further aircraft had been built.

Several variants are planned including, a patrol aircraft with an FLIR head, an air ambulance, a cargo aircraft, and an amphibious version.

Specifications

References

External links

Manufacturer's page

2000s Polish civil utility aircraft
Twin-engined pusher aircraft
Twin-engined piston aircraft
Shoulder-wing aircraft